Clarence Robinson may refer to:

 Clarence Robison (1923–2006), track athlete and coach at Brigham Young University 
 Clarence Robinson (baseball), American baseball player
 Clarence Robinson (boxer) (born 1949), Jamaican boxer
 Clarence B. Robinson (1911–2002), Tennessee politician
 Chuckie Robinson (basketball) (born 1972), American basketball player